The 2008–09 season was Aston Villa's 134th professional season; their 98th season in the top-flight and their 21st consecutive season in the top flight of English football, the Premier League. They were managed by Martin O'Neill – in his third season since replacing David O'Leary. The 2008–09 season was the first spell in European competition for O'Neill, and the first for Villa, in 6 seasons.

The club's first summer signing was the permanent capture of on-loan West Brom centre-back, Curtis Davies, in July, while their first sale was made in May, as Luke Moore completed a move to West Brom in an initial £3 million deal, after he had spent the second half of the 2007–08 season there on loan.

The fixtures for the 2008–09 season were announced on Monday 16 June 2008, with Aston Villa beginning at home against Manchester City and finishing the season at home to Newcastle. Due to Birmingham's relegation at the end of the 2007–08 season, there was no Second City derby, however they faced local rivals West Brom on 20 September 2008 at The Hawthorns and on 10 January 2009 at home. 

In December 2008, Everton player and boyhood Villa fan, Joleon Lescott put two past Villa and still lost the match following Ashley Young's "brilliant" equalizer.

After 25 games, having qualified for the UEFA Cup as joint winners of the Intertoto Cup, the club were third in the table on 51 points, 2 points above Chelsea on level games and 7 points above Arsenal in 5th place and on course for a place in the Champions League for the first time since 1983. O'Neill decided to prioritise Champions League qualification above all else, fielding a virtual reserve side for a UEFA Cup game against CSKA Moscow which was subsequently lost. Following this, Villa failed to win any of the next 8 league games and improving form for Arsenal & Chelsea meant that Villa failed to reach the top 4.

Players

First-team squad

Squad at end of season

Left club during season

Reserve squad
The following players made most of their appearances for the reserve team this season, and did not appear for the first team.

Youth squad
The following players made most of their appearances for the youth team this season, but may have also appeared for the reserves.

Other players
The following players did not appear for any squad this season.

Trialists

Transfers

Summer
Defender Curtis Davies signed a permanent deal at Aston Villa after a loan spell. English midfielder Steve Sidwell joined from Chelsea on 10 July 2008. On 26 July 2008, former USA shot-stopper Brad Friedel signed from Blackburn Rovers for an undisclosed fee, thought to be £2million. On 7 August 2008 Aston Villa completed the signing of Nicky Shorey on a three-year deal for an undisclosed fee. Also on 7 August 2008, Aston Villa completed the signing of Luke Young in a deal that could reach £6 million, on a three-year contract. On 12 August 2008, Aston Villa signed Carlos Cuéllar in a deal worth £7.8 million on a four-year contract. Villa's offer had triggered a release clause in Cuéllar's contract with Rangers.

Luke Moore made his loan move to West Bromwich Albion a permanent deal  Defender Olof Mellberg left the club to sign for Italian giants Juventus after seven years at Aston Villa. Thomas Sørensen was also released at the end of his contract after 5 years of service, Stoke City eventually signed the Denmark international on a free transfer. Twins Damian and Yago Bellon left Villa after 2 years with the club, as Damian signed for FC Vaduz in Liechtenstein, whilst Yago joined Swiss side FC St. Gallen. Elsewhere, Irish youngster Danny Earls joined American USL team Rochester Rhinos, and defender Erik Lund returned home to join IFK Göteborg in Sweden. Lund was the only released youngster who played for the first-team during his time with the club, coming on as a substitute in a pre-season victory over Walsall in August 2007. Shaun Maloney was the last to leave the club in the summer transfer window, returning to Celtic after a frustrating spell under Martin O'Neill.

In

Out

Winter
On 2 January 2009, Wayne Routledge signed a -year deal with Queens Park Rangers, following a loan spell at fellow Championship club Cardiff City. Villa confirmed their first signing of the window four days later, in the form of 17-year-old Dutch defender Arsenio Halfhuid from SBV Excelsior, who signed for an undisclosed fee. On 23 January 2009, Emile Heskey followed, signing for £3.5 million from Wigan Athletic. Young winger Zoltán Stieber was the final player to leave Villa Park during January, as he signed for TuS Koblenz for an undisclosed fee, after failing to break into the first-team. Swiss U17 goalkeeper Benjamin Siegrist also signed from FC Basel during this month.

In

Out

Out on loan

Competitions

Overall
Premier League: Sixth
League Cup: Third Round (Knocked out by Q.P.R.)
FA Cup: Fifth Round (Knocked out by Everton)
UEFA Intertoto Cup: Joint-winner, qualified for UEFA Cup
UEFA Cup: Round of 32 (Knocked out by CSKA Moscow)

Premier League

Final league table

Results summary

Matches

Pre-season friendlies

First-Team

Reserves

Academy

Statistics

Player statistics

First-Team

Last Update: End of season
Data includes all competitive competitions

Reserves/Academy

Last Update: 25 March 2009
Data includes all competitions
Zoltán Stieber signed for TuS Koblenz on 29 January 2009. Conor Devlin and Aldi Haxhia were signed on emergency short-term loan deals. Both returned to Manchester United and Chelsea respectively.

Squad information

Notes

References

External links
Aston Villa official website
avfchistory.co.uk 2008–09 season

Aston Villa F.C. seasons
Aston Villa